The National All-Star Academic Tournament (NASAT) is a national quizbowl tournament for state-based high school all-star teams held every June by International Quiz Bowl Tournaments. The current reigning champion is New Jersey.

History 
The tournament was founded in 2009 with an initial event date of June 12–13, 2010. Originally, it was designed as an alternative to other all-star academic competitions.

The tournament has been held at Vanderbilt University, the University of Maryland, Ohio State University, and the University of Kentucky.

From 2012 to 2018, The National History Bee and Bowl awarded the National Quizbowl Awards at NASAT.

On March 17, 2020, IQBT announced that the 2020 iteration of NASAT would be cancelled due to the COVID-19 pandemic.

Qualification 

All-star teams representing any U.S. state (or equivalents such as Washington, D.C., Guam and Canadian provinces, etc.) apply to IQBT for entry into the field and are selected based on team strength.

Format 

Teams typically play in a round-robin, with additional playoff rounds being held depending on the number of teams attending. Games are played in a tossup/bonus format.

List of Champions

References

External links

Student quiz competitions
2010 establishments in the United States